Jiwaka is a province of Papua New Guinea. The provincial capital is temporarily located in Kurumul. Mostly all provincial matters are handled in Kurumul while few are handled in Banz and Minj.

The province covers an area of 4,798 km², and there are 343,987 inhabitants (2011 census final figures—2000 census 185,641). Jiwaka province officially came into being on 17 May 2012, comprising three districts previously part of Western Highlands Province. Mount Wilhelm, the tallest mountain in Papua New Guinea, is on the border of Jiwaka.

"Jiwaka" is a portmanteau word combining the first two letters each of Jimi, Waghi and Kambia, the three districts from which the new province was formed. The name also recalls Lucas Joseph Waka, a former District Commissioner at Mt.Hagen, who was the first District Commissioner of  Melanesian race. This inclusion of the Anglimp Rural LLG in Jiwaka was controversial, and will be reviewed after the 2012 General Election.

Geographical and Natural Resources 
Jiwaka is located in a very fertile land (Waghi Valley). The Waghi River runs between the valley and most of the people benefit out of it. Besides the Waghi River, the land is naturally fertile and people harvest the best food from it. The 3 resources of the Jiwaka people are coffee, tea and human resources. (SKM-Manda Dam-Tukoi)

Districts and LLGs 
There are three districts in the province. Each district has one or more Local Level Government (LLG) areas. For census purposes, the LLG areas are subdivided into wards and those into census units.

Provincial leaders

Chairman of the Jiwaka Transitional Authority (2010–2012)

Governors (2012–present)

Members of the National Parliament

The province and each district is represented by a Member of the National Parliament.  There is one provincial electorate and each district is an open electorate.

References

 
Provinces of Papua New Guinea
Highlands Region
States and territories established in 2012